Dihanaam is a type of congregational prayer sung by women in Assam in praise of the Assamese saint Sankardev. Instruments like the Negera, taal, khol and also hand-clapping is used in it. The songs are derived from Vaishnava religious scriptures like Kirtan-ghosa. The songs are sung in call and response style.

References

Music of Assam
Oral literature of Assam
Ekasarana Dharma
Prayer